SCOR SE is a French tier 1 reinsurance company providing Property and Casualty (P&C) and Life reinsurance solutions to its clients. It is one of the leading reinsurers in the world. Created in 1970 with the backing of the French government, its original name was Société Commerciale de Réassurance, hence "SCOR". The SE acronym indicates that the company is a Societas Europaea (European company). In 2007, it became the first French listed company to use the SE acronym in its name.

History 
SCOR SE was founded in 1970 in Paris, France. SCOR today is the world's fourth largest reinsurer and has a presence in 160 countries worldwide with more than 3,000 employees.

In 1996, SCOR acquired the reinsurance business of Allstate.

In 2002, Denis Kessler was named the chairman and CEO after a near collapse of the company. Kessler was brought on board in order to restore the reinsurer's financial performance. Kessler made a number of acquisitions throughout his tenure. These include ReMark, Revios, Converium, Transamerica Re, and Generali US.

The firm's shares are listed on NYSE Euronext Paris and form part of the CAC Next 20 index. In 2007, SCOR de-listed itself from the New York Stock Exchange.

In May 2019, SCOR purchased Coriolis Capital, an insurance-linked securities fund manager. The purchase was finalized in September 2019, increasing the company's ILS portfolio to over $2 billion.

SCOR Foundation for Science

In 2011, SCOR founded the SCOR Corporate Foundation for Science to support scientific research and risk-related knowledge.

Main operating lines 

The main companies of SCOR SE (officially typeset as SCOR) include SCOR Global P&C, which provides property and casualty reinsurance, SCOR Global Life, which provides life reinsurance, and SCOR Global Investments, an asset management company.

Business units 
SCOR consists of several business units:

 Reinsurance: include Property & Casualty and Life & Health units
 Speciality Insurance: include SCOR Business Solutions and Channel Syndicate units
 Asset Management: includes SCOR Global Investments unit, which had total investments of nearly €30 billion in 2019 with total invested assets of €20.6 billion

References

External links

Financial services companies established in 1970
Insurance companies of France
Reinsurance companies
1970 establishments in France
Companies based in Paris
Companies listed on Euronext Paris